Vance Lee Watt II (born August 16, 1976), better known by his stage name Praiz', is an American entertainer, songwriter, producer, singer, and worship leader. Praiz' is best known as an artist for his single "Deliver Me".

Early life
Praiz' was born in Gary, Indiana but later relocated to St. Louis, Missouri, after his father died. He is the youngest of four children.

Career

1995–1999 Career Beginnings
Praiz' began as a producer, performer and writer in St. Louis, Missouri. Traveling with his uncle, promoter and manager Sonny Metcalfe, Praiz' learned the business and honed his studio and performing skills. After performing with several R&B groups, Praiz' decided to go solo. In 1999 Praiz' released his first self-produced R&B solo album, Wave Yo Hands. Praiz' performed concerts with R&B acts, including Boyz II Men, Ginuwine, Outkast and oldie artists Con Funk Shun and The Dells.

1999–2003: Jericho Records
Wave Yo Hands became the only R&B album Praiz' officially released. After a serious car accident, he turned his focus to producing, engineering and writing for several hip hop, R&B, gospel and Christian rap artists, including Chingy and Thi'sl. During this time, Praiz' formed Jericho Records with his business partner and mentor, Darren Mack Sr. Together, with Praiz' as the sole producer and writer, they produced for a series of Contemporary Gospel artists including Young Saint, Holy Child, Psalms and 2 Life 2 Christ compilations. This led them to win several awards such as Praise God Productions' "Record Company of the Year Award" in 2000. During this period, Praiz' released two self-produced and written independent contemporary gospel albums: The Race and Preacha's Ball.

2004–2011: Parking Lot Praiz' Beats
Praiz' parted ways with his previous recording artists and partners to form Parking Lot Praiz' Beats. In 2005 Praiz' released The Take Over as an independent artist. The album led with singles Deliver Me, Selah Selah, Praiz''' and More Than Conquerors. Weeks later, his song Deliver Me became highly requested on top R&B and Gospel Clear Channel radio stations, leading the song to become No. 1 for several weeks and remained in the top 10 for more than a year. Chris King, the chief editor of The St. Louis American, wrote a detailed review of the album with a front page cover, stating, "The devil must be mad as hell at STL's new prince of Praiz'".

Awards
In 2006 Praiz' won "Best Contemporary Gospel Artists" from Saint Louis Music Awards, sponsored by KDHX FM 88.1 and Playback STL magazine.

Best Gospel Artist of 2006

2012 The Best St. Louis Gospel Musicians of All Time

Style of music
Praiz' has been called the Nelly of Gospel. Reporter Chris King described Praiz' in an article saying, "But where Nelly came up with the club, the grind and the streets in his verses, Praiz' is all about God and Jesus and the Holy Ghost. What can I say? The Nelly of the gospel is in the house – God's house, that is, but we get to listen, and it sure does sound good."

Personal life
Praiz' married in 2003 and has 4 children. Praiz' is a worship pastor and musician leading worship weekly in the community.

Discography
Albums
 Wave Yo Hands (1998)
 The Race (1999)
 Preacha's Ball (2002)
 The Take Over (2005)
 Pride (2008)
 Anthem Lineage (2014)
 The Perfect Peace Project'' (2016)

Singles
 Let Go (2010)
 Stomp On the Devil (2011)
 We Are Family (2015)
 Celebrate Joy Is Here (2016)

See also

 List of American musicians

References

External links
 Official Website

1976 births
Living people
21st-century American musicians
Musicians from Gary, Indiana
21st-century American singers
21st-century American male singers
American male singer-songwriters
Singer-songwriters from Indiana